Homalopteroides tweediei is a species of ray-finned fish in the genus Homalopteroides. It can be found in the Mekong basin, Malay Peninsula, and Borneo.

References

Balitoridae
Fish described in 1940